Claude Cloutier is a Canadian film animator and illustrator based in Quebec. Cloutier to date has made seven short films with the National Film Board of Canada. Cloutier began his animation career with the 1988 short The Persistent Peddler (Le colporteur), which was in competition at the Cannes Film Festival. He first became widely known for From the Big Bang to Tuesday Morning (Du big bang à mardi matin) in 2000, which was both a Genie Award nominee for Best Animated Short Film at the 21st Genie Awards, and a Jutra Award nominee for Best Animated Short Film at the 3rd Jutra Awards.

His 2007 short Sleeping Betty (Isabelle au bois dormant) is a humorous Sleeping Beauty adaptation that received numerous international and Canadian awards including both the Genie and the Jutra. His 2015 short Carface (Auto Portraits), received the Prix Guy-L.-Coté Best Canadian Animation Film at Sommets du cinéma d'animation in Montreal and had been shortlisted for a possible Academy Award nomination.

Cloutier has said that in his youth, it had been his dream to become an animated filmmaker and that when he began working as an illustrator, he did so with the hope of being able to transition into animation. He worked most notably as an illustrator with the now-defunct Quebec satirical magazine Croc, with two comic book-style series La légende des Jean-Guy and Gilles la Jungle contre Méchant-Man. His hoped-for entry into animation came when an NFB producer asked him if he wished to adapt La légende des Jean-Guy into an animated short, which resulted in The Persistent Peddler.

The summer of 2015, Cloutier did a two-week "Frame x Frame" exhibition at the Musée de la civilisation in Quebec City, during which the public could watch him working on his next film. Cloutier has said his animation technique involves working first with paper and ink: "I draw on paper with brush, India ink and water, for nuance and half-tones. After that, it's colored by computer. I like to draw on paper. I'm old-school."

Filmography
The Persistent Peddler (Le colporteur) - 1988
Mirrors of Time - 1991
Overdose - 1995
Science Please! (Une minute de science, s.v.p.!) - 1998-2000
The Wind (Le Vent)
Wheel Meets Friction (La roue contre la friction)
Slippery Ice! (La glace glisse)
The Force of Water (La force de l'eau)
The Wonderful World of Colour (Le monde merveilleux de la couleur)
The Internal Combustion Engine (Le moteur à explosion)
From the Big Bang to Tuesday Morning (Du big bang à mardi matin) - 2000
The Trenches (La Tranchée) - 2001
Sleeping Betty (Isabelle au bois dormant) - 2007
Carface (Autos portraits) - 2015
Bad Seeds (Mauvaises herbes) - 2021

References

External links

1957 births
Film directors from Quebec
Canadian animated film directors
Artists from Montreal
Film directors from Montreal
Canadian cartoonists
Directors of Genie and Canadian Screen Award winners for Best Animated Short
National Film Board of Canada people
French Quebecers
Living people